Geosynchronous Satellite Launch Vehicle (GSLV) is an expendable launch system operated by the Indian Space Research Organisation (ISRO). GSLV was used in fourteen launches from 2001 to 2021. Even though GSLV Mark III shares the name, it is an entirely different launch vehicle.

History 
The Geosynchronous Satellite Launch Vehicle (GSLV) project was initiated in 1990 with the objective of acquiring an Indian launch capability for geosynchronous satellites.

GSLV uses major components that are already proven in the Polar Satellite Launch Vehicle (PSLV) launch vehicles in the form of the S125/S139 solid rocket booster and the liquid-fueled Vikas engine. Due to the thrust required for injecting the satellite in a geostationary transfer orbit (GTO) the third stage was to be powered by a LOX/LH2 Cryogenic engine which at that time India did not possess or have the technological expertise to build.

The first development flight of the GSLV (Mk I configuration) was launched on 18 April 2001 was a failure as the payload failed to reach the intended orbit parameters. The launcher was declared operational after the second development flight successfully launched the GSAT-2 satellite. During the initial years from the initial launch to 2014 the launcher had a checkered history with only 2 successful launches out of 7.

Cryogenic engine controversy 
The third stage was to be procured from Russian company Glavkosmos, including transfer of technology and design details of the engine based on an agreement signed in 1991. Russia backed out of the deal after United States objected to the deal as in violation of the Missile Technology Control Regime (MTCR) in May 1992. As a result, ISRO initiated the Cryogenic Upper Stage Project in April 1994 and began developing its own cryogenic engine. A new agreement was signed with Russia for 7 KVD-1 cryogenic stages and 1 ground mock-up stage with no technology transfer, instead of 5 cryogenic stages along with the technology and design as per the earlier agreement. These engines were used for the initial flights and were named GSLV Mk I.

Vehicle description 

GSLV employs S-band telemetry and C-band transponders for enabling vehicle performance monitoring, tracking, range safety / flight safety and preliminary orbit determination. The Redundant Strap Down Inertial Navigation System/Inertial Guidance System of GSLV housed in its equipment bay guides the vehicle from lift-off to spacecraft injection. The digital auto-pilot and closed loop guidance scheme ensure the required altitude maneuver and guide injection of the spacecraft to the specified orbit.

Liquid boosters 
The first GSLV flight, GSLV-D1 used the L40 stage. Subsequent flights of the GSLV used high pressure engines in the strap-on boosters called the L40H. The GSLV uses four L40H liquid strap-on boosters derived from the L37.5 second stage, which are loaded with 42.6 tons of hypergolic propellants (UDMH and N2O4). The propellants are stored in tandem in two independent tanks  diameter. The engine is pump-fed and generates  of thrust, with a burn time of 150 seconds.

First stage 
GSLV-D1 used the S125 stage which contained  of solid propellant and had a burn time of 100 seconds. All subsequent launches have used enhanced propellant loaded S139 stage. The S139 stage is 2.8 m in diameter and has a nominal burn time of 100 seconds.

Second stage 
The GS2 stage is powered by the Vikas engine.

Third stage 
The third stage of the GSLV Mark II is propelled by the Indian CE-7.5 cryogenic rocket engine while the older defunct Mark I is propelled using a Russian made KVD-1.

Variants 
GSLV rockets using the Russian Cryogenic Stage (CS) are designated as the GSLV Mark I while versions using the indigenous Cryogenic Upper Stage (CUS) are designated the GSLV Mark II. All GSLV launches have been conducted from the Satish Dhawan Space Centre in Sriharikota.

GSLV Mark I 
The first developmental flight of GSLV Mark I had a 129 tonne (S125) first stage and was capable of launching around 1500 kg into geostationary transfer orbit. The second developmental flight replaced the S125 stage with S139. It used the same solid motor with 138 tonne propellant loading. The chamber pressure in all liquid engines were enhanced, enabling a higher propellant mass and burn time. These improvements allowed GSLV to carry an additional 300 kg of payload. The fourth operational flight of GSLV Mark I, GSLV-F06, had a longer third stage called the C15 with 15 tonne propellant loading and also employed a  diameter payload fairing.

GSLV Mark II 
This variant uses an Indian cryogenic engine, the CE-7.5, and is capable of launching 2500 kg into geostationary transfer orbit. Previous GSLV vehicles (GSLV Mark I) have used Russian cryogenic engines.

For launches from 2018, a 6% increased thrust version of the Vikas engine was developed. It was demonstrated on 29 March 2018 in the GSAT-6A launch second stage. It was used for the four Vikas engines first stage boosters on future missions.

A 4m diameter Ogive payload fairing was developed and deployed for the first time in the EOS-03 launch on 12 August 2021, although this launch was a failure due to technical anomalies with the Cryogenic Upper Stage. This will allow GSLV vehicles to accommodate larger payloads.

Launch history 

Launch system status

Gallery

See also 
 
 Comparison of orbital launchers families
 Comparison of orbital launch systems
 LVM 3
 PSLV
 ISRO
 ASLV
 SLV

References

External links 

 ISRO GSLV Page
 INDIA in Space – GSLV Page
 12KRB (KVD-1) Upper Stage at Khrunichev Space Center

 
ISRO space launch vehicles
2001 in spaceflight
Satish Dhawan Space Centre
Vehicles introduced in 2001
Expendable space launch systems